Giangiacomo Feltrinelli Editore is an Italian publishing company founded in 1954 by Giangiacomo Feltrinelli.

Imprints
Feltrinelli imprints include:

 Feltrinelli
 Universale Economica Feltrinelli
 Feltrinelli Zoom
 Feltrinelli KIDS
 Fox Crime Feltrinelli
 Gribaudo
 Kowalski
 Marsilio
 Urra
 Apogeo
 Apogeo Sushi
 Editorial Anagrama

Bookstores
Besides publishing the company also owns a bookstore chain. In Milan there is Fondation Feltrinelli, the biggest store of the chain that also programs theater, live music, open debates, lectures, and workshops.

External links
 Official web site 

Publishing companies of Italy
Publishing companies established in 1954
Bookshops of Italy